Gunniopsis septifraga, commonly known as green pigface, is a species of flowering plant in the iceplant family, Aizoaceae and is endemic to Australia. It is a prostrate to tuft-forming annual herb, with oblong to lance-shaped leaves and small greenish flowers, that grows around salt lakes.

Description
The inside of the perianth is green and the outside greenish yellow, the lobes usually alternating with four stamens. Flowering occurs from July to October and the fruit is a capsule that is more or less spherical with a cylindrical tip, and contains wrinkled, white to transparent, comma-shaped seeds.

Taxonomy
This species was first formally described as Gunnia septifraga by Ferdinand von Mueller in 1859 in Report on the Plants Collected During Mr. Babbage's Expedition into the North West Interior of South Australia in 1858, presented to the Parliament of Victoria. The type specimens were collected near "Stuart's Creek" by Joseph Herrgott.

In 1867 George Bentham described Gunnia drummondii in Flora Australiensis but both Gunnia septifraga and G. drummondii were later reclassified as  Neogunnia septifraga and N. drummondii by Ferdinand Pax and Käthe Hoffmann in Adolf Engler and Karl Anton Eugen Prantl's 1934 work Die Naturlichen Pflanzenfamilien. 

In 1983, Robert Chinnock changed the name Neogunnia saxifraga to Gunniopsis saxifraga in the Journal of the Adelaide Botanic Gardens, the genus Gunniopsis having been described in 1889 by Pax. Chinnock considered Neogunnia drummondii to be a synonym of N. saxifraga and that interpretation is accepted by the Australian Plant Census. The specific epithet (septifraga) means to break and refers to how the seed pod breaks open.

Distribution
Green pigface grows in extremely saline situations, around the edges and in the damp bottoms of salt lakes and salt pans, often forming dense patches around Tecticornia shrubs. It occurs in the Mid West, Wheatbelt and Goldfields-Esperance regions of Western Australia and in arid inland areas of the Northern Territory, South Australia and New South Wales.

References

septifraga
Flora of Western Australia
Flora of South Australia
Flora of New South Wales
Flora of the Northern Territory
Plants described in 1859
Taxa named by Ferdinand von Mueller